Centrophthalmus elegans is a species of rove beetles in the subfamily Pselaphinae. It has a palaearctic distribution.

References

External links 

 Centrophthalmus elegans at insectoid.info

Beetles described in 1912
Pselaphitae
Beetles of Asia